Aggersel was an ancient city in the Roman province of Africa Proconsularis. Aggersel was a former Roman Catholic Diocese of the Roman Catholic Church and is now a titular see.

References

External links
http://www.catholic-hierarchy.org/diocese/d2a59.html 

Roman towns and cities in Africa (Roman province)